The 2021 Biella Challenger Indoor III was a professional tennis tournament played on hard courts. It was the 3rd edition of the tournament which was part of the 2021 ATP Challenger Tour. It took place in Biella, Italy between 8 and 14 March 2021.

Singles main-draw entrants

Seeds

 1 Rankings are as of 1 March 2021.

Other entrants
The following players received wildcards into the singles main draw:
  Stefano Napolitano
  Luca Nardi
  Giulio Zeppieri

The following player received entry into the singles main draw using a protected ranking:
  Dustin Brown

The following players received entry from the qualifying draw:
  Andrea Arnaboldi
  Matthias Bachinger
  Jonáš Forejtek
  Akira Santillan

The following player received entry as a lucky loser:
  Julian Lenz

Champions

Singles

  Andreas Seppi def.  Liam Broady 6–2, 6–1.

Doubles

 Quentin Halys /  Tristan Lamasine def.  Denys Molchanov /  Sergiy Stakhovsky 6–1, 2–0 ret.

References

2021 ATP Challenger Tour
2021 in Italian tennis
March 2021 sports events in Italy
Biella Challenger Indoor